The Carlton, Moscow (formerly The Ritz-Carlton, Moscow) is a 334-room 5-star luxury hotel in the center of Moscow.

History
The Ritz-Carlton, Moscow was developed by Kazakh property development group Capital Partners and financed by Merrill Lynch Capital Markets Bank and Aareal Bank. It was designed by Andrey Meyerson and constructed between 2005-2007, on the site of the demolished Hotel Intourist. It opened on July 1, 2007. The hotel was sold in 2011 for $600 million to Verny Capital, a Kazakh private equity firm, whose chief investor is Kazakh billionaire Bulat Utemuratov. That same year, CNN reported that the hotel's Ritz-Carlton Suite was one of the 15 most expensive hotel rooms in the world. 

The hotel ceased to be managed by The Ritz-Carlton Hotel Company division of Marriott International on July 5, 2022, when Marriott severed its relationship with all 22 of its properties in Russia, due to sanctions in response to the 2022 Russian invasion of Ukraine. It was renamed The Carlton, Moscow on July 8, 2022.

See also
Timeline of Russian interference in the 2016 United States elections

Gallery

References

External links

The Carlton, Moscow official website

Hotels in Moscow
Hotels established in 2007
Hotel buildings completed in 2007
New Classical architecture